José Manuel Pasquel (March 13, 1793 – October 15, 1857) was a Peruvian archbishop.

José Manuel Pasquel was the son of Tomás Pasquel y Garcés and Clara Losada y Palencia. He studied at the San Carlos Convictorio and the Universidad Mayor de San Marcos where he graduated as a Doctor of Theology and Canon Law. He was second lieutenant in the Battalion's number, but was inclined to religious life and entered the Seminary of Santo Toribio in Lima in 1816 . He received Holy Orders in 1817. He served in Huacho and Atavillos Bajo, then transferred to Concepción in the province of Jauja in 1830, the year he was also appointed Chaplain to the Supreme Government.

He was ordained as a bishop in 1848, and installed as Archbishop of Lima on 16 Dec 1855.

References

Roman Catholic archbishops of Lima
1793 births
1857 deaths
People from Lima
19th-century Roman Catholic bishops in Peru